Radomír Halfar is a former Czechoslovak slalom canoeist who competed in the 1970s.

He won two medals in the C-2 team event at the ICF Canoe Slalom World Championships with a gold in 1977 and a silver in 1975.

References
Overview of athlete's results at canoeslalom.net 

Czechoslovak male canoeists
Living people
Year of birth missing (living people)
Medalists at the ICF Canoe Slalom World Championships